Giovanni-Alessandro Goracuchi (b. Trieste, January 27, 1807 - d. Trieste, February 3, 1887) was a scientist, doctor and diplomat in 19th-century Austrian Istria. He was born to a Catholic Albanian family. His published works are mostly written in Italian but also in French, German and other languages. He frequently sailed as a ship's surgeon in various journeys and expeditions. Goracuchi was also involved in the political affairs of Ottoman Shkodra (from where his family descended) as a representative of Austria-Hungary. He was knighted by Austria-Hungary and became known as Rittern von Goracuchi or in Italian Cavaliere de Goracuchi.

Publications 

Strenna per l'anno 1849.
Dell'acqua comune e di mare. Premessi alcuni cenni sulla forza medicatrice della natura. Stud.

References 

1807 births
1887 deaths
Austrian knights
Austrian people of Albanian descent